Freddy's Nightmares is television series spin-off of the successful movie series A Nightmare on Elm Street. In the United States, the first episode of the series originally aired on October 8, 1988.<ref name="episodeguide">{{cite web|url=http://nightmareonelmstreetfilms.com/site/freddys-nightmares/|title=Epi-Log #8 (July 1991) – Freddy's Nightmares|publisher=Star Tech|accessdate=2013-07-15}}</ref> The series ran for two seasons, ending on March 12, 1990, after 44 episodes.

The series has had a limited release on VHS in the United States, United Kingdom, Australia, Brazil, Italy, and the Netherlands. In the United States, the series was released on September 11, 1991, in five volumes, with one episode per volume. The UK released eight volumes, with two episodes per volume. The other countries released the same episodes as that of the UK release. The UK released a two volume DVD set on June 9, 2003.

Series overview

Episodes

With the exception of the pilot, all of the episodes carried two separate storylines. The first half hour would be devoted to one story, while the last half hour would be devoted to a second storyline.
Season 1 (1988–1989)

Season 2 (1989–90)

References

External links
 
 Freddy's Nightmares'' at Nightmare on Elm Street Companion

Freddy's Nightmares
Freddy's Nightmares
Television episodes about nightmares
A Nightmare on Elm Street (franchise) lists